Chen Yu (born 18 March 1944) is a Chinese information scientist and information economist.

Biographical sketch 
Chen Yu was born in Wuxi, China, on March 18, 1944. He is now professor of Information School, Renmin University of China. He is notable for his academic achievements in information science and information economics. His major research fields include computer applications, information management, systems science and information economics. He has been the adviser of about 30 doctoral candidates during 1995-2009.

Education 

 1981: Graduated from Renmin University of China, with master's degree in Management
 1965: Graduated from Beijing Normal College, with bachelor's degree in Mathematics

Positions

Present Positions 

 Professor, Information School, Renmin University of China
 Director, China Information Economics Society
 Member, National e-Government Standardization General Group
 Director, Laboratory for Economical Sciences, Renmin University of China
 Informatization Consultant, Beijing Municipal Government
 Member (1988- ), IFIP WG 8.1
 Member (1999- ), IFIP TC 8
 Member, Association for Computing Machinery
 Member, IEEE

Former Positions 

 Dean, Information School, Renmin University of China
 Director, Information Center, Renmin University of China
 Director, Network Center, Renmin University of China

Major works (Chinese titles translated into English) 

 A course for information management engineers (2006)
 An introduction to information science and methodology (2006)
 Analysis and design of information systems (2005)
 An introduction to information management and information systems (2005)
 Digitizing enterprises (2003)
 Basic knowledge in the information age (2000)
 Software development tools (2000)
 A course of information economics (1998)
 Measurement theory and methodology for knowledge economy (1998)
 Practical handbook of office automation (1997)
 An introduction to economic information management (1996)
 Dialogues about systems: phenomena, inspirations and discussions (1989)

References 

 "陈禹" (Biographical Sketches of Chen Yu), Website of the Information School, Renmin University of China, https://web.archive.org/web/20090421172842/http://info.ruc.edu.cn/yuanqin/mingshi/news.asp?newsid=768 (Viewed on March 17, 2009)

1944 births
Living people
Information economists
Information systems researchers
Academic staff of Renmin University of China
Renmin University of China alumni
Scientists from Wuxi
Writers from Wuxi
Educators from Wuxi